This is a list of films with performances that have been nominated in all of the Academy Award acting categories.

The Academy of Motion Picture Arts and Sciences annually bestows Academy Awards for acting performances in the following four categories: Best Actor, Best Actress, Best Supporting Actor, and Best Supporting Actress.

Films 

As of the 95th Academy Awards (2022), there have been fifteen films containing at least one nominated performance in each of the four Academy Award acting categories. 

In the following list, award winners are listed in bold with gold background; others listed are nominees who did not win. No film has ever won all four awards.

Superlatives 

No film has won all four awards; however, there are two films that hold the distinction of winning three out of the four categories they were nominated in:

 A Streetcar Named Desire (1951) 
 Network (1976)

Four of the nominated films hold a total of five nominations, each with an additional nomination within one of the four categories:

 Mrs. Miniver (1942) – two nominations for Best Supporting Actress
 From Here to Eternity (1953) – two nominations for Best Actor
 Bonnie and Clyde (1968) – two nominations for Best Supporting Actor
 Network (1976) – two nominations for Best Actor

Three of the nominated films failed to win any of the four awards: 

 My Man Godfrey (1936) – also failed to win any other Academy Awards
 Sunset Boulevard (1950)
 American Hustle (2013) – also failed to win any other Academy Awards

Only two of the nominated films won Best Picture:

 Mrs. Miniver (1942)
 From Here to Eternity (1953)

Only one of the nominated films was not nominated for Best Picture:

 My Man Godfrey (1936)

Five performers were nominated for their work in two different films that received nominations in all acting categories (winners in bold):

 William Holden (Sunset Boulevard, Network)
 Warren Beatty (Bonnie and Clyde, Reds)
 Faye Dunaway (Bonnie and Clyde, Network)
 Bradley Cooper (Silver Linings Playbook, American Hustle)
 Jennifer Lawrence (Silver Linings Playbook, American Hustle)

Only one director has directed two films that received nominations in all four categories:

 David O. Russell (Silver Linings Playbook, American Hustle)

The 40th Academy Awards (1967) was the only ceremony in which multiple films held at least one nomination in all four acting categories:

 Bonnie and Clyde
 Guess Who's Coming to Dinner

All of the films, except My Man Godfrey and For Whom the Bell Tolls were also nominated for the "Big Five" categories (Best Picture, Best Director, Best Actor,  Best Actress and Best Screenplay (Original or Adapted)).

See also 

 List of Big Five Academy Award winners and nominees
 List of films with two or more Academy Awards in an acting category

Acting nom